The Rebel Sport Masters was a Tier 2 golf tournament on the PGA Tour of Australasia held in January 2018 at Wainui Golf Club, Wainui, New Zealand. Total prize money was A$100,000. Matthew Millar won by four strokes, taking the first prize of A$15,000. The event was sponsored by Rebel Sport.

Winners

External links
Coverage on the PGA Tour of Australasia's official site

Former PGA Tour of Australasia events
Golf tournaments in New Zealand